Marinkelle's sword-nosed bat (Lonchorhina marinkellei) is a bat species found in Colombia. In 2013, Bat Conservation International listed this species as one of the 35 species of its worldwide priority list of conservation. Its species name marinkellei was chosen to honor the Dutch scientist Cornelis Johannes Marinkelle, who worked in Colombia.

Description
It is the largest of the sword-nosed bats. They weigh . Their propatagium is hairless, and their plagiopatagium is mostly hairless, with the exception of a few short hairs. They are dark brown in color.

Biology and ecology
They are insectivorous, based on stomach content analysis. Little is known about their reproductive patterns, but a pregnant female was once found in August.

Distribution
While records of this species exist in French Guiana, these are likely mistaken. This species has been confirmed in two sites in Colombia. The first-described individual was captured in a small cave in a humid forest. Subsequent individuals have been captured while foraging in open savanna habitat. Like the Fernandez's sword-nosed bat, it is also found in the Llanos. They are found in association with granite "tepui" formations in eastern Colombia. They have been found roosting in small caves with Orinoco sword-nosed bats, Seba's short-tailed bats, Yellow-throated big-eared bats, and Lesser dog-like bats, although they prefer the darkest parts of the cave.

Conservation
It has only been encountered twice, in surveys that were twenty years apart. This species is currently listed as vulnerable by the International Union for Conservation of Nature because it is confirmed to occur in only two areas. In 2008, it was listed as endangered, but its status was reevaluated after the criteria to be considered "endangered" were updated. This species is threatened by habitat destruction, and is at-risk of becoming critically endangered in the future. Some of the bats' habitat may be protected by nearby national parks, including Chiribiquete National Park. These parks may prove instrumental in preserving the granite tepui that the bats use as roosts.

References

Lonchorhina
Mammals of Colombia
Endemic fauna of Colombia
Mammals described in 1978
Endangered animals
Endangered biota of South America
Bats of South America